Danta is a city in the taluka of the same name in the Banaskantha district of the Indian state of Gujarat. It lies about 150 km north of Ahmedabad city, and on the border of Gujarat with Rajasthan.

Demography 
The majority of residents are Hindu but there are also a substantial Muslim population and smaller ones of Christians and Jains.

Politics 
Since 1998, the Danta assembly seat has been held by Gadhvi Mukeshkumar Bhairavdanji of the Indian National Congress party.

Distances 
 Roughly 150 km from the Airport in Ahemdabad to Danta
 Nearest Railway station is 40 km from both Abu Road and Palanpur
 Udaipur — is about 2 and a half hours to 3 hrs drive only.
 Ambaji Temple - 18 km
 Kumbhariya Jain Temple - 22 km
 Koteshwar Shiv Temple - 30 km
 Taranga Jain Temple - 30 km
 Rani-Ki-vav, Patan - 80 km
 Vadnagar Arches - 60 km
 Modhera Sun Temple - 90 km
 Mt. Abu - 70 km

External links 
 Election results at the Government of India's Election Website

Villages in Banaskantha district